Menegazzia valdiviensis is a species of lichen found in South America. It was first described in 1932 as Parmelia valdiviensis by Finnish lichenologist Veli Räsänen. Rolf Santesson transferred it to the genus Menegazzia in 1942.

See also
List of Menegazzia species''

References

valdiviensis
Lichen species
Lichens described in 1942
Lichens of South America
Taxa named by Veli Räsänen